William Guy Hardwick (May 30, 1910 – January 15, 1993) was an American politician who served as the 18th Lieutenant Governor of Alabama from 1955 to 1959.

External links
Biography by the Alabama Department of Archives & History

Lieutenant Governors of Alabama
1910 births
1993 deaths
Alabama Democrats
20th-century American politicians